USS Wyffels  (DE-6) was an  in the United States Navy during World War II.

Intended for transfer to Great Britain, Wyffels was laid down as BDE-6 on 17 October 1942 at Charlestown, Massachusetts, by the Boston Navy Yard; launched on 7 December 1942; retained by the United States and redesignated DE-6 on 25 January 1943; renamed Wyffels on 19 February 1943; and commissioned on 15 April 1943.

Namesake
Lawrence Edward Wyffels was born on 20 January 1915, on a farm east of Marshall, Minnesota. He enlisted in the Navy on 7 March 1936. His citations included the Purple Heart, the Silver Star, Good Conduct medal, the World War II Victory Medal, the American Defense medal, and the Asiatic Pacific medal. It was in the battle of Santa Cruz on 26 October 1942 that he was killed by an enemy bomb.

History

United States Navy (1942-1945)
Following sea trials in April, Wyffels got underway from Boston on 8 May 1943, and for the remainder of the month conducted exercises out of Bermuda. In June, she alternated operations out of Norfolk, Virginia with drydock periods. On 27 June 1943, she departed from Hampton Roads on the first of 11 wartime voyages escorting convoys across the treacherous Atlantic to Mediterranean ports. Her first voyage proved uneventful, although the return from Casablanca was enlivened by the investigation of sound contacts. On 29 July, the destroyer escort left her station to guard a tanker, which had fallen behind due to engine failure. Long, anxious hours ensued as Wyffels circled the disabled ship while repairs were being made; she then escorted the straggler back to her convoy.

From August 1943-April 1945, Wyffels, with occasional interruptions for exercises off the New England coast, conducted 10 more successful circuit voyages escorting convoys to and from North Africa. On her Atlantic crossings, the ship acted as a versatile and valuable part of the Atlantic convoy system, marshalling reluctant merchantmen, protecting stragglers, and searching for the source of each sound contact which might, at any time, turn out to be a predatory German submarine. In winter, stormy weather and heavy seas slowed the awkward merchant ships and increased the number of stragglers, complicating the task of the escort vessels.

On 11 May 1944, Wyffels was escorting UGS-40, a convoy of 56 merchant ships bound for Bizerte, when she experienced her most perilous moments. Shortly after sunset, a task force order to go to general quarters jolted Wyffels from the normal routine of convoy duty. Ships of the escort began laying smoke, and soon Wyffels' radar picked up a group of approaching planes. After a tense, six-minute wait, the ominous calm of the Mediterranean night was broken as first  and then  opened fire.

Moments later, seamen in Wyffels spotted the first wave of attacking planes as they came into view low over the water, some four miles away. Wyffels opened fire as the planes passed down her port side and sped off toward the convoy's port quarter. Moments passed as the destroyer escort patrolled at full speed, her guns silent. An aerial attacker appeared out of the smoke, dropped an ill-aimed torpedo, and disappeared. Amidst a telling crossfire from Wyffels and other members of the escort, the plane banked to the right, missing the forward part of the ship. Smoke poured from the attacker as it rapidly lost altitude and disappeared in a burst of black smoke.

Soon after, Wyffels took under fire another plane which emerged from the convoy's barrage and passed directly over the ship's forecastle and along her starboard side. The aircraft then continued on its way, apparently without having suffered serious damage. Other ships continued to fire for 10 minutes, but the raiders had departed without scoring a single hit on the convoy or its escort.

Through the final year of the war in Europe, Wyffels continued her protection of Atlantic convoys. On 13 April 1945, as Wyffels was en route home from what was to be her last wartime Atlantic convoy, the destroyer escort received word that President Franklin D. Roosevelt had died, and she lowered her colors to half mast. After repairs at Charleston later that month, she arrived at Miami on 11 May. In the following months, she operated off Florida and in the Bahamas, serving as a school ship training student crews in basic gunnery and antisubmarine warfare.

Republic of China Navy (1945-1972)
On 28 August 1945, she was decommissioned and leased to the Republic of China, which she served as Tai Kang. Wyffels was permanently transferred to the Republic of China Navy in February 1948 and was struck from the Navy list on 12 March 1948.

On 23 June 1954, She joined the blockade task force to capture and confiscate the civilian oil tanker Tuapse of the Soviet Union with kerosene passing the high sea of Balintang Channel at  near Philippines eastbound toward the west Pacific Ocean, whereas the crew were detained in various time frames up to 34 years in captivity and certain deaths.

Awards

Notes

References

External links

 Photo gallery at navsource.org

Evarts-class destroyer escorts
Ships built in Boston
1942 ships
World War II frigates and destroyer escorts of the United States
Evarts-class destroyer escorts of the Republic of China Navy